Willard Almond Lasley (July 13, 1902 – August 21, 1990) was a Major League Baseball pitcher.

External links
Baseball Reference.com

1902 births
1990 deaths
St. Louis Browns players
Major League Baseball pitchers
People from Gallipolis, Ohio
Baseball players from Ohio